Reach for the Sky is the fourth studio album by the American glam metal band RATT.

Background
Though it sold well enough to achieve platinum status and spawned the popular songs "Way Cool Jr." and "I Want a Woman", the record's performance was not enough to keep the group on the road for longer than seven months. As a result, "What's It Gonna Be", a track not released as a single, was used as a B-side to "Lovin' You's a Dirty Job", the first single from the band's next release Detonator. In doing so, it was hoped that listeners would go back and give Reach for the Sky a second listen.

Reach for the Sky marked the last Ratt album to be produced by Beau Hill. The band originally intended for the record to be produced entirely by Mike Stone. However, substandard DAT tape recordings of Stone's production efforts prompted then-Atlantic Records president Doug Morris to bring in Hill to assist Stone and salvage the album.

Opening acts on the promotional record tour included Great White, Warrant and Kix.

Pro-wrestler Brian Pillman used "Don't Bite the Hand That Feeds" as his theme music, when WCW talent went on tour with New Japan Pro-Wrestling. Another pro wrestler, Larry Zbyszko, used "City To City" as his theme music in New Japan.

Track listing

Personnel
Ratt
Stephen Pearcy – lead vocals
Robbin Crosby – lead & rhythm guitar, backing vocals
Warren DeMartini – lead & rhythm guitar, backing vocals
Juan Croucier – bass guitar, backing vocals
Bobby Blotzer – drums, percussion, harmonica, washboard

Additional musicians
New West Horns arranged by Chris Botti and Kent Smith

Production
Beau Hill – producer, mixing
Mike Stone – producer
Stephen Benben – engineer, mixing
Al Wright – engineer
Marty Hornburg, Tom Banghart, Jim Mitchell – assistant engineers

Charts

Album

Canada Top Albums/CDs

Singles

Certifications

References

Ratt albums
1988 albums
Atlantic Records albums
Albums produced by Mike Stone (record producer)
Albums produced by Beau Hill